So Chan (Su Can), also known by his nickname Beggar So (So Fa-tsz or So Hut-yee), was a Chinese martial artist and folk hero who lived during the late Qing dynasty. One of the Ten Tigers of Canton, he was best known for his drunken boxing.

Background
Born during the late Qing Dynasty, So Chan was from Nanhai District, Foshan, Guangdong, or Hunan according to one source, he was skilled in unarmed Chinese martial arts skills, Drunken Eight Immortals Boxing, Shaolin staff said to be taught by the Shaolin monk Chan Fook, and also brutal boxing.

He formulated the unusual Golden Bowl and Iron Chopsticks technique, which involved the use of an iron bowl on one hand to provoke the opponent and striking the opponent's acupuncture points with the iron chopsticks on another hand.

He was a wanderer and made a living performing martial arts and acrobatics with his younger sister in the streets of Guangdong. He also taught martial arts at Sancheng Community Training Centre in Guangzhou and would later be known as one of the Ten Tigers of Canton. So exchanged ideas with So Hak-fu, a fellow martial artist of the Ten Tigers of Canton, and imparted the technique of Golden Bowl and Iron Chopsticks along with some of his drunken boxing skills to him. He also exchanged ideas with two other Ten Tigers martial artists Leung Kwan and Wong Kei-ying as well.

According to a folklore, So Chan also taught Wong Kei-ying's son Wong Fei-hung in drunken boxing.

It was assumed that So was believed to have died during the early reign of the Guangxu Emperor.

In popular culture
He was first portrayed by Liu Chi-wai in at least six black-and-white Wong Fei-hung films starring Kwan Tak-hing from 1950 to 1961.

He was portrayed by Lam Kau in the 1953 black-and-white films The Beggar Named Su, The Swordsman And The Beauty, and Revenge of the Beggar Named Su.

He was portrayed by Yuen Siu-tien in the 1978 film Drunken Master, and Yuen has often been associated with the character Beggar So ever since.

He was portrayed by Kwok Choi-hon in the 1978 film Ten Tigers of Shaolin.

He was portrayed by Lau Kar-leung in the 1978 film Heroes of the East.

He was portrayed by Yuen Siu-tien again in the 1979 film Story of Drunken Master.

Yuen went on to reprise the role in the 1979 film Dance of the Drunk Mantis.

He was portrayed by Philip Kwok in the 1979 film Ten Tigers from Kwangtung.

Yuen Siu-tien reprised the role for the last time only as a cameo in the opening credits of the 1979 film World of the Drunken Master, with Lee Yi-min and Yu Chung-chiu portraying young and old versions of Beggar So respectively.

Yuen was supposed to reprise his role as So Chan in the 1979 film Magnificent Butcher, but he died on 8 January 1979 as production of the film was beginning. Fan Mei-sheng portrayed So Chan in that film.

He was portrayed by Chow Yun-fat in the 1982 TVB television drama series The Legend of Master So.

He was portrayed by Gordon Liu in the 1985 film Young Vagabond.

He was portrayed by Stephen Chow in the 1992 film King of Beggars.

He was portrayed by Donnie Yen in the 1993 film Heroes Among Heroes.

He was portrayed by Cheng Pei-pei in the 1996 television series Wong Fei Hung Series: The Final Victory.

He was portrayed by Lam Chi-ho in the 1999 ATV television drama series Ten Tigers Of Guangdong.

He was portrayed by Felix Wong in the 2000 television drama series The Legend of Master Soh.

He was portrayed by Pu Ye Dong in the 2005 television drama series Kung Fu Beggar.

He was portrayed by Vincent Zhao in the 2010 film True Legend.

He was portrayed by an opera actor Zhang Xinyi of the Xiuqin Opera Troupe in the opera show Beggar So during the Kaohsiung Spring Art Festival 2016.

He was portrayed by Jun Cao in the 2016 film Master of the Drunken Fist: Beggar So.

References

Beggars
Cantonese folklore
Chinese warriors
People from Nanhai District
Sportspeople from Guangdong